= Código de Investigación =

2025 Spanish television talk show

- Also known as: CDI: Codigo de Investigacion
- Genre: Talk show True crime
- Starring: Borja Voces
- Original language: Spanish

Original release
- Network: Las Estrellas; Univision
- Release: January 14, 2025 – present

Código de Investigación is a Spanish television talk show on true crime. Broadcast by Las Estrellas
Univision, the first episode premiered on January 14, 2025. The show outlines prominent cases and analyses the events of a crime or incident. The show is hosted by Borja Voces and regularly broadcasts at 10 p.m. PST and 9 p.m. CST.

== Cast ==
=== Main ===
- Borja Voces, host of the television series
- Erika Monroy, psychologist of the television series

== Format ==
The show begins with an introduction of a case, as well as giving an overview of the case, such as where, when, and what happened during the incident, it then begins analyzing the crime in chronological order. A team of experts, including a lawyer, a psychologist, a former FBI agent, among others help investigate and analyze the case alongside answering questions, and sharing opinions.

The host may invite guests onto the show, to give more information about the subject on the given case or give further insight on the investigation.
